Erich Emminger (25 June 1880 – 30 August 1951) was a German lawyer and Catholic politician of the Center Party (Zentrum) and later of the Bavarian People's Party (BVP).

He served as Minister of Justice in the Weimar Republic from 30 November 1923 until 15 April 1924 under Chancellor Wilhelm Marx.

Early life
Erich Emminger was born on 25 June 1880 in Eichstätt, Bavaria. His parents were Johann Adolf Erich Emminger (1856-1909), a Gymnasialprofessor, and his wife Marie Therese (1854–99), née Müller, daughter of an Augsburg notary. Emminger married Maria Schärft in 1906. Their children included Otmar Emminger, who became president of the Deutsche Bundesbank.

Following his training as a lawyer at Münster, Emminger practiced law at Augsburg (1906–08) and Nuremberg (1908–09). In 1909 he became a civil servant (state prosecutor and Amtsrichter). He participated in World War I first as a voluntary soldier and later as a Kriegsgerichtsrat (judge-advocate).

Political career
Emminger was a member of the Catholic Center Party (Zentrum) and, from 1913 to 1918 held a seat in the Reichstag for the constituency of Weilheim. In 1918, he joined the Bavarian People's Party (BVP) and represented it in the Reichstag 1920-33.

Emminger was Minister of Justice in the first cabinet of chancellor Wilhelm Marx, which took office on 30 November 1923. These significantly changed civil and criminal law and the judiciary system with an eye towards speeding up proceedings. The reform of 4 January became known as the so-called Emminger Reform that among other things abolished the jury as trier of fact and replaced it with a mixed system of judges and lay judges in Germany's judiciary which still exists today. Schwurgerichte (formerly based on jurors) kept their name but were in fact replaced by lay judges. Since the reforms were successful, they were kept in place by later legislation once the enabling law had lapsed.

Late 1923 was among the most tumultuous times of the Weimar Republic, bringing the peak of hyperinflation and the ongoing Occupation of the Ruhr. One of Emminger's main goals as a politician and lawyer became a revaluation of the currency to partially offset the adverse social consequences of hyperinflation. As a minister he prevented the planned Aufwertungsverbot from becoming law and continued to fight for revaluation as a Reichstag delegate.

Emminger left office on 15 April 1924 and his Secretary of State, Curt Joël, took over as acting Minister of Justice. He remained a member of the Rechtsausschuss of the Reichstag and 1927-31 served as chairman of the Zentralvorstand der deutsch-österreichischen Arbeitsgemeinschaft which worked towards a harmonisation of German and Austrian laws. He also contributed to a reform of the criminal law.

Emminger was re-elected to the Reichstag in 1933 but the Nazi takeover ended his political activities. He worked as a judge at the Oberste Landesgericht of Bavaria in 1931-35 and then at the Oberlandesgericht. From 1946 until his retirement in July 1949, he was Senatspräsident there.

Emminger died in Munich on 30 August 1951.

Publications
 Die Aufwertungsfrage im aufgelösten Reichstage, 1924

References

External links
 
 Erich Emmminger at the Akten der Reichskanzlei online version (German)
 Bio of Erich Emminger in a databank on (Imperial) Reichstag delegates (German)
 More biographical information on Erich Emminger, Datenbank der deutschen Parlamentsabgeordneten (German)

1880 births
1951 deaths
People from Eichstätt
People from the Kingdom of Bavaria
German Roman Catholics
Centre Party (Germany) politicians
Bavarian People's Party politicians
Justice ministers of Germany
Members of the 13th Reichstag of the German Empire
Members of the Reichstag of the Weimar Republic
German Army personnel of World War I